German submarine U-556 was a Type VIIC U-boat of Nazi Germany's Kriegsmarine during World War II. She was laid down on 2 January 1940 at the Blohm & Voss yard in Hamburg as yard number 532, launched on 7 December 1940, and commissioned on 6 February 1941 under the command of Kapitänleutnant Herbert Wohlfarth, who commanded her for her entire career. U-556 conducted only two patrols, sinking six ships totalling  and damaging one other of 4,986 GRT, before she was sunk on 27 June 1941.

Design
German Type VIIC submarines were preceded by the shorter Type VIIB submarines. U-556 had a displacement of  when at the surface and  while submerged. She had two shafts and two  propellers.

U-556 was fitted with five  torpedo tubes (four fitted at the bow and one at the stern), fourteen torpedoes, one  SK C/35 naval gun, 220 rounds, and a  C/30 anti-aircraft gun. The boat had a complement of between forty-four and sixty.

Service history

First patrol
U-556 sailed from Kiel for her first patrol on 1 May 1941. She headed out into the waters of the northern Atlantic, south of Greenland. She made her first kill on 6 May, sinking the 166 GRT Faroese fishing trawler Emanuel with her deck gun west of the Faroe Islands.

On 10 May she joined the wolfpack West attacking Convoy OB 318 south-east of Cape Farewell. Her first victim was the 4,986 GRT British merchant ship Aelybryn, hit by one of the torpedoes fired by the U-boat at 04:42.

The convoy scattered, but at 07:52 U-556 torpedoed and sank the 4,861 GRT British merchant ship .

The U-boat had her third success of the day at 20:37, sinking the 5,086 GRT Belgian merchant ship Gand. One crew member was lost and another wounded. The master, 38 crewmen and four gunners were rescued.

Ten days later, on 20 May, the wolfpack attacked Convoy HX 126. Between 14:48 and 15:16 U-556 fired torpedoes at the convoy and sank two British merchant ships, the 4,974 GRT Darlington Court and the 5,995 GRT Cockaponset, and the 8,470 GRT tanker British Security. Loaded with 11,200 tons of benzine and kerosene, the tanker caught fire and burned for three days before sinking. There were no survivors from her crew of 53.

The sinking of Bismarck

On 26 May, while returning from patrol, low on fuel and having fired all her torpedoes, U-556 was ordered to reconnoitre the most recently reported position of the battleship .

U-556 and Bismarck had been neighbours in the ways at Blohm & Voss and their construction was completed at about the same time. (Bismarck was commissioned on 24 August 1940.) In January 1941, as U-556s commissioning ceremony approached, Wohlfarth wanted a band for the celebration, but could not afford to hire one. Kapitän Ernst Lindemann, commanding officer of Bismarck, lent him his ship's band.

As thanks, Wohlfarth drew up a humorous Patenschaftsurkunde ("Certificate of Sponsorship") promising that U-556 would protect Bismarck. A drawing shows Wohlfarth as the knight Parzival [Percival] (his nickname) on the deck of U-556 simultaneously bringing down planes with a sword and reaching underwater to stop a torpedo with his thumb. A second drawing then shows the submarine towing the battleship to safety.

The text accompanying the drawing reads:

Around 19:50, Wohlfahrt saw the battlecruiser  and the aircraft carrier  coming out of the mist at high speed. He recorded in his log, "Enemy bows on, 10 degrees to starboard, without destroyers, without zigzagging," but without any torpedoes, could only submerge and avoid them. Wohlfahrt saw activity on Ark Royals flight deck, which transpired to be the launching of the second, fatal attack on Bismarck. At 20:39, Wohlfahrt surfaced and transmitted, "Enemy in view, a battleship, an aircraft carrier, course 115, enemy is proceeding at high speed. Position 48° 20′ N, 16° 20′ W." Renowns and Ark Royals course toward Bismarck coincided almost exactly with his own; he proceeded on the surface at full speed behind them.

Wohlfahrt's War Diary contains these entries for 27 May 1941:
00:00, (wind) north-west 5, seaway 5, rain squalls, moderate visibility, very dark night. Surfaced. What can I do for Bismarck? I can see star shells being fired and flashes from Bismarck's guns. It is a terrible feeling to be near and not to be able to do anything. All I can do is reconnoitre and lead in boats that have torpedoes. I am keeping contact at the limit of visibility, reporting the position, and sending directional signals to call up the other boats.

03:52: I am moving around on the east side to the south, in order to be in the direction of the activity. I soon reach the limit of what I can do in view of my fuel supply. Otherwise, I won't get home.

04:00: The seas are rising ever higher. Bismarck still fighting. Reported weather for the Luftwaffe.

Around 06:30 Wohlfahrt sighted  and transferred the mission of maintaining contact with Bismarck to Kapitänleutnant Eitel-Friedrich Kentrat. He gave Kentrat Bismarcks position based on his observations of the star shells fired during the night, adding: "I have not seen her directly. You assume contact. I have no more fuel." Wohlfahrt then submerged and did not surface again until noon, a time at which radio signals were routinely repeated. That was when he heard for the first time the order radioed to him between 07:00 and 08:00 to pick up Bismarcks War Diary. He replied to the Befehlshaber der U-Boote ("Commander-in-Chief for Submarines") Karl Dönitz, asking that this mission be transferred to Kentrat, who received the radio order, "U-boat Kentrat pick up Bismarck War Diary," but was unable to locate Bismarck. The battleship had been sunk before Wohlfahrt had received the first message at noon.

U-556 arrived at Lorient, in occupied France on 30 May 1941 after 30 days at sea, where Wohlfahrt received the Knight's Cross (Ritterkreuz) from Dönitz personally.

Second patrol
U-556 departed from Lorient on 19 June 1941, and once more headed out into the Atlantic. Five of the crew were killed and 41 survived.

Wolfpacks
U-556 took part in one wolfpack, namely:
 West (10 – 20 May 1941)

Summary of raiding history

References

Bibliography

External links

 The Special Bond between the Bismarck and the U-556

German Type VIIC submarines
World War II submarines of Germany
World War II shipwrecks in the Atlantic Ocean
U-boats sunk by depth charges
U-boats sunk by British warships
1940 ships
Ships built in Hamburg
U-boats commissioned in 1941
U-boats sunk in 1941
Maritime incidents in June 1941